Gevelsberg West station is a through station in the town of Gevelsberg in the German state of North Rhine-Westphalia. The station was opened with the Witten–Wengern Ost/Schwelm railway from Witten-Höhe to Schwelm that was opened by Deutsche Reichsbahn on 15 May 1934. It has two platform tracks and it is classified by Deutsche Bahn as a category 6 station.

The station is served by Rhine-Ruhr S-Bahn line S 8 between Mönchengladbach and Hagen and line S 9 between Recklinghausen and Hagen, both every 60 minutes.

Notes

Rhine-Ruhr S-Bahn stations
S8 (Rhine-Ruhr S-Bahn)
S9 (Rhine-Ruhr S-Bahn)
Ennepe-Ruhr-Kreis
Railway stations in Germany opened in 1934